Bellacythara is a genus of minute sea snails, marine gastropod mollusks or micromollusks in the family Mangeliidae.

Species
Species within the genus Bellacythara include:
 Bellacythara bella (Hinds, 1843)

References

 McLean, J.H. (1971) A revised classification of the family Turridae, with the proposal of new subfamilies, genera, and subgenera from the Eastern Pacific. The Veliger, 14, 114–130
  Bouchet, P.; Kantor, Y. I.; Sysoev, A.; Puillandre, N. (2011). A new operational classification of the Conoidea. Journal of Molluscan Studies. 77, 273-308

External links
  Tucker, J.K. 2004 Catalog of recent and fossil turrids (Mollusca: Gastropoda). Zootaxa 682:1-1295.
 Todd, Jonathan A. "Systematic list of gastropods in the Panama Paleontology Project collections." Budd and Foster 2006 (1996).

 
Gastropod genera